Ryan L. Verdugo (born April 10, 1987) is a Mexican-American professional baseball player for El Águila de Veracruz of the Mexican League. He has played in Major League Baseball (MLB) for the Kansas City Royals and the Chinese Professional Baseball League (CPBL) of Taiwan for the Uni-President Lions.

Career
Verdugo attended Lake Stevens High School in Lake Stevens, Washington. He was chosen by the Philadelphia Phillies in the 43rd round of the 2005 Major League Baseball Draft, but did not sign. Verdugo then attended Skagit Valley College for two years. He was drafted by the San Francisco Giants in the 47th round of the 2007 Major League Baseball Draft, but again did not sign.

Verdugo transferred to Louisiana State University (LSU) for his junior season, where he played for the LSU Tigers baseball team. Following the 2008 season, he was drafted by the Giants in the 9th round (267th overall) of the 2008 Major League Baseball Draft, and signed.

Kansas City Royals
Following the 2011 season, Verdugo was traded by the Giants to the Kansas City Royals with Jonathan Sánchez for Melky Cabrera. He was added to the Royals' 40-man roster on November 18 to protect him from the Rule 5 draft. Verdugo made his major-league debut on July 17, 2012, against the Seattle Mariners. He allowed six runs in  innings, including an RBI double to Jesus Montero and a two-run home run to Justin Smoak, and picked up the loss. The left-hander fared better after being sent down to Triple-A Omaha, posting a season record of 12–4 with a 3.75 ERA in 24 starts. Verdugo was designated for assignment by the Royals on November 20, 2012 as they cleared room on the 40-man roster ahead of the Rule 5 draft. He was subsequently outrighted to AAA.

Naranjeros de Hermosillo
Verdugo pitched for Naranjeros de Hermosillo of the Mexican Pacific League on the 2013–14 season.

Boston Red Sox
On July 16, 2014, Verdugo was traded to the Boston Red Sox in exchange for cash considerations.

Oakland Athletics
On November 20, 2014, Verdugo, along with LHP Jim Fuller, signed a minor league contract with the Oakland Athletics organization. He began the season with the Triple-A Nashville Sounds.

Los Angeles Angels
On July 6, 2015, Verdugo was traded to the Los Angeles Angels organization, where he played for the Triple-A Salt Lake Bees. On November 6, 2015, Verdugo elected free agency.

Mexican League (first stint)
On April 28, 2016, Verdugo signed with the Rojos del Águila de Veracruz of the Mexican Baseball League. On July 3, 2016, Verdugo was traded to the Leones de Yucatán. He was released on April 23, 2017. On April 24, 2017, Verdugo signed with the Pericos de Puebla of the Mexican Baseball League. On May 9, 2017, Verdugo was traded to the Acereros de Monclova.

Uni-President Lions
On February 14, 2018, Verdugo signed with the Uni-President Lions of the Chinese Professional Baseball League. On October 7 of the same year, Verdugo completed the first (and, to date, only) perfect game in CPBL history. He re-signed with the Uni-Lions for the 2019 season, at the conclusion of which he became a free agent.

Mexican League (second stint)
On February 11, 2020, Verdugo signed with the Acereros de Monclova of the Mexican League. Verdugo did not play in a game in 2020 due to the cancellation of the Mexican League season because of the COVID-19 pandemic. Verdugo re-signed with the team for the 2021 season. In 11 appearances, he posted a 14.49 ERA and gave up 34 hits over 13.2 innings pitched. On July 19, 2021, Verdugo was loaned to El Águila de Veracruz (previously known as the Rojos del Águila de Veracruz) of the Mexican League for the remainder of the 2021 season. He was returned to Monclova following the conclusion of the season. On October 13, 2021, Verdugo, along with IF Jose Vargas and P Andrew Morales, were traded to the Saraperos de Saltillo of the Mexican League in exchange for OF Juan Perez. On July 28, 2022, Verdugo was traded to the Toros de Tijuana. On February 24, 2023, Verdugo's rights were re-acquired by El Águila de Veracruz of the Mexican League.

References

External links

CPBL

1987 births
Living people
Acereros de Monclova players
American baseball players of Mexican descent
American expatriate baseball players in Mexico
American expatriate baseball players in Taiwan
Arizona League Giants players
Arizona League Royals players
Augusta GreenJackets players
Kansas City Royals players
Salem-Keizer Volcanoes players
San Jose Giants players
LSU Tigers baseball players
Omaha Storm Chasers players
Major League Baseball pitchers
Mexican League baseball pitchers
Naranjeros de Hermosillo players
Nashville Sounds players
Northwest Arkansas Naturals players
Pawtucket Red Sox players
People from Lake Stevens, Washington
Pericos de Puebla players
Richmond Flying Squirrels players
Rojos del Águila de Veracruz players
Salt Lake Bees players
Scottsdale Scorpions players
Uni-President Lions players
2019 WBSC Premier12 players